Ken Coomer is an American musician and producer best known for his drumming in Uncle Tupelo and later Wilco. He was the drummer and co-founder of the Nashville-based band, Clockhammer, in the late 1980s/early 1990s.

Career 
Coomer produced the debut solo album of Vaquero's singer Chetes, which achieved platinum record sales in the Mexican music market. In 2017, he produced the debut album of the Colombian indie rock band AppleTree called Horas Perdidas, which was named the #1 Colombian album of 2018.

As a member of Wilco, Coomer has performed on A.M., Being There, Summerteeth, and Yankee Hotel Foxtrot.

Coomer has also played on or produced albums by Steve Earle, Frontier Ruckus, Arlo McKinley ,Sons of Bill, Tim Finn, Will Hoge, Jars of Clay, Emmylou Harris, Toy Horses, Malcolm Holcombe, Josh Hoyer and Soul Colossal and Shaver.

Personal life 
He lives in Nashville, Tennessee.

References

1960 births
Living people
Record producers from Tennessee
People from Nashville, Tennessee
Wilco members
Uncle Tupelo members
20th-century American drummers
American male drummers